The 1998 Miami Hurricanes football team represented the University of Miami during the 1998 NCAA Division I-A football season. It was the Hurricanes' 73rd season of football and eighth as a member of the Big East Conference. The Hurricanes were led by fourth-year head coach Butch Davis and played their home games at the Orange Bowl. They finished the season 9–3 overall and 5–2 in the Big East to finish in a three-way tie for second place. They were invited to the MicronPC Bowl where they defeated NC State, 46-23.

Schedule

References

Miami
Miami Hurricanes football seasons
Cheez-It Bowl champion seasons
Miami Hurricanes football